Riverside is an unincorporated community in Jefferson County, in the U.S. state of Missouri.

History
A post office called Riverside was established in 1890, and remained in operation until 1910. The community's name alludes to the nearby Mississippi River.

References

Unincorporated communities in Jefferson County, Missouri
Unincorporated communities in Missouri